George A. Gorham Jr. (born April 20, 1987) is an American professional stock car racing driver. He primarily competes in short track racing in his home state Florida, where he drives the No. 10 late model. He also competed part-time in the NASCAR Xfinity Series, driving the No. 90 Chevrolet Camaro for DGM Racing.

Racing career
Much of Gorham's racing career has been spent on short tracks in central Florida. During the mid-2000s, he raced in the FASCAR Pro Truck Series.

In 2017, he won his first career late model track championship at Showtime Speedway. A second track title came at 4-17 Southern Speedway the following year. Gorham is going into the 2022 Racing season as defending back-to-back track champion at his home track of Auburndale Speedway. Gorham began competing at raceways in the Florida Panhandle in 2019 when he debuted in the Blizzard Series. In February 2021, Gorham beat Stephen Nasse to win the second leg of the Super Late Model Crown at Showtime Speedway, which earned him $10,000.

Gorham made his NASCAR Xfinity Series debut in the Cook Out 250 at Martinsville Speedway on April 11, 2021, driving the No. 90 for DGM Racing with sponsorship from late model partner Blackburn's BBQ. After starting 37th, Gorham finished ninth in the second of three stages before ending his day in 18th.

Motorsports career results

NASCAR
(key) (Bold – Pole position awarded by qualifying time. Italics – Pole position earned by points standings or practice time. * – Most laps led.)

Xfinity Series

 Season still in progress
 Ineligible for series points

References

External links
 

Living people
1987 births
NASCAR drivers
Racing drivers from Florida
Sportspeople from Lakeland, Florida